Andriy Savchenko may refer to:

 Andriy Savchenko (ice hockey) (born 1972), Ukrainian ice hockey player
 Andriy Savchenko (footballer) (born 1994), Ukrainian footballer